Dancing with Danger is the second album by Leslie Phillips, released in 1984 on Myrrh Records. The album peaked at number 20 on the Billboard Top Inspirational Albums chart.

Critical reception
AllMusic wrote that "while the focus of the album is on dance music, Phillips' pop smarts are already evident, and her songwriting is unconventional (especially for Christian music)."

Track listing
All songs written by Leslie Phillips

Side one
 "Dancing with Danger" (remix)  – 3:29
 "I Won't Let It Come Between Us" (remix)  – 4:32
 "Strength of My Life" (guest vocals by Russ Taff)  – 5:34
 "Give 'em All You've Got (Tonight)"  – 4:24
 "By My Spirit" (with Matthew Ward) - 4:43

Side two
 "Hiding in the Shadows"  – 3:52
 "Powder Room Politics"  – 2:40
 "Light of Love"  – 4:17
 "Song in the Night"  – 3:52
 "Here He Comes with My Heart"  – 2:48

CD bonus track 
 "By My Spirit" (Radio version) – 5:42

Personnel 
 Leslie Phillips – lead vocals, backing vocals
 Jeff Lams – keyboards, arrangements (3, 5, 6, 7, 9, 10)
 John Andrew Schreiner – keyboards, arrangements (8)
 Dann Huff – guitars, arrangements (1, 2, 4)
 Nathan East – bass 
 Carlos Vega – drums
 Victor Feldman – percussion
 James Hollihan – backing vocals
 Buddy Owens – backing vocals
 Russ Taff – backing vocals
 Greg X. Volz – backing vocals
 Matthew Ward – backing vocals

Production 
 Brad Burkhart – executive producer
 Dan Posthuma – producer
 Jeremy Smith – tracking engineer
 Mike McClain – vocal engineer
 Bill Deaton – additional engineer
 John Early – additional engineer 
 David Schober – additional engineer
 Bud Wyatt – additional engineer
 Bill Schnee – mixing
 Mike Reese – mastering 
 Steve Hall – remastering
 Bradley Grose – photo concept
 Aaron Rapoport – photography
 Vigon/Seireeni – art design

Studios
 Mixed at Eagle Audio Recording (Fort Worth, Texas).
 Originally mastered at The Mastering Lab (Hollywood, California).
 Remastered at Future Disc (North Hollywood, California).

Charts

Radio singles

References

1984 albums
Sam Phillips (musician) albums
Myrrh Records albums
Word Records albums